Django @ Liberchies is a gypsy jazz festival, taking place every May since 2003 in Liberchies (Pont-à-Celles, Belgium), in honour of Django Reinhardt.

See also
 List of jazz festivals

References

External links
 
 Website about Django

Jazz festivals in Belgium
Spring (season) events in Belgium